Shyamal Datta is a former governor of the Indian state of Nagaland.

Shyamal Datta was born on 10 May 1941. He joined the Indian Police Service in July 1965 . He served as Superintendent of Police in several districts of West Bengal and as Deputy Commissioner of Police in Calcutta city.

In January 1979 he joined the Intelligence Bureau of the Government of India where he served in various capacities. In October 1994, he was appointed Director of the elite Special Protection Group (SPG). In April 1997, Shri Datta reverted to the Intelligence Bureau as Additional Director and was promoted as Special Director in December 1997. He took over as Director, Intelligence Bureau, on 17 April 1998. He retired on superannuation on 31 May 2001.

Datta was recipient of the Indian Police Medal for meritorious service and the President's Police Medal for distinguished service.

Shyamal Datta became the Governor of Nagaland on 28 January 2002.

See also 
Governors of Nagaland

External links

Indian police officers
Governors of Nagaland
Living people
1941 births